Just 4 Fun was a Norwegian band from the early 1990s.

The members were Marianne Antonsen, Jan Groth, Eiríkur Hauksson and Hanne Krogh. Krogh represented Norway in the Eurovision Song Contest 1971 and reached the 17th position, 14 years later she won in the band Bobbysocks. Eiríkur Hauksson participated in 1986 for Iceland as a part of the trio ICY, and then again for Iceland in 2007 as a solo artist.

The group became famous after giving a few concerts. They represented Norway in the Eurovision Song Contest 1991 with the song "Mrs. Thompson". They were the first and until then the only Norwegian entry that was not chosen through the Melodi Grand Prix. The Norwegian television was confident in a high placing with this band, but they turned out to be wrong as the band finished in 17th place.

Groth, the band's former lead vocalist, died from cancer on 27 August 2014, at the age of 68.

References

Norwegian musical groups
Eurovision Song Contest entrants for Norway
Eurovision Song Contest entrants of 1991